The world's oceans have different names in different languages. This article attempts to give all known different names for the five oceans.

See also

Exonyms by language
Afrikaans exonyms
Albanian exonyms
Basque exonyms
Bulgarian exonyms
Catalan exonyms
Croatian exonyms
Czech exonyms
Danish exonyms
Dutch exonyms
English exonyms
Estonian exonyms
Finnish exonyms
French exonyms
German
German exonyms
Australian place names changed from German names
German names for Central European towns
German placename etymology
List of English exonyms for German toponyms
List of German exonyms for places in Belgium
List of German exonyms for places in the Czech Republic
List of German exonyms for places in Croatia
List of German exonyms for places in Poland
List of German exonyms for places in Switzerland
Greek exonyms
Hungarian exonyms
Icelandic exonyms
Irish exonyms
Italian exonyms
Latvian exonyms
Names of Lithuanian places in other languages
Lithuanian exonyms
Names of Belarusian places in other languages
Maltese exonyms
Norwegian exonyms
Names of Belarusian places in other languages
Names of Lithuanian places in other languages
Portuguese exonyms
Romanian exonyms
Russian exonyms
Names of Belarusian places in other languages
Names of Lithuanian places in other languages
Serbian exonyms
Slavic toponyms for Greek places
Slovak exonyms
Slovenian exonyms
Spanish exonyms
Swedish exonyms
Turkish exonyms
Ukrainian exonyms
Vietnamese exonyms
Welsh exonyms

Other
Exonym and endonym
Toponomy
Lists of places
Lists of etymologies
List of countries and capitals in native languages
List of alternative country names
List of country names in various languages
List of European exonyms
List of Latin place names in Europe
List of European regions with alternative names
List of European rivers with alternative names
Place names in Irish
List of traditional Greek place names
Names of Asian cities in different languages
List of cities in the Americas with alternative names
List of cities in Europe
List of metropolitan areas in Europe by population
List of villages in Europe by country
Names of Belarusian places in other languages
Names of Lithuanian places in other languages

Language comparison
Alternative place names
Oceanographical terminology